Roger Aníbal Espinoza Ramírez (born 25 October 1986) is a Honduran professional footballer and manager who plays as a midfielder or defender and is a youth manager for Major League Soccer club Sporting Kansas City. A former Honduras international, Espinoza has represented his country at two World Cups and the 2012 Summer Olympics.

Club career

Youth and College
Born in Puerto Cortés, Espinoza moved from his native Honduras to Denver, Colorado when he was 12 years old. He attended Denver South High School before transferring to Regis Jesuit High School in Aurora, Colorado.

He played two years of college soccer at Yavapai College, spending one season with the Arizona Sahuaros of the National Premier Soccer League in 2006. In 2007, he transferred to Ohio State for his junior season. That season, Ohio State advanced to  the national championship game of the College Cup. Espinoza scored in the 12th minute, but Ohio State lost to Wake Forest, 2–1. In his one season at Ohio State, Espinoza was named first-team All-Big Ten, second-team all-region, and earned a spot the NCAA College Cup All-Tournament Team.

Sporting Kansas City
Espinoza opted to forgo his senior year of college and signed a Generation Adidas contract with Major League Soccer. He was selected with the 11th overall pick of the 2008 MLS SuperDraft by the Kansas City Wizards (now known as Sporting Kansas City). In his first season at the club, he appeared in 22 games and tied for third on the team in assists with 3. Playing as both a leftback and defensive midfielder, he appeared in 113 regular season matches over five years with the club and helped Sporting to victory in the 2012 Lamar Hunt U.S. Open Cup.

Wigan Athletic
Following the 2012 MLS season, Espinoza signed with Wigan Athletic of the English Premier League on a free transfer. He was assigned number 18.

Espinoza made his Wigan Athletic debut on 19 January when he came on as a half-time substitute during a 2–3 loss against Sunderland. He scored his first goal for the club against Swansea City on 7 May. On 11 May 2013, Espinoza won the FA Cup with Wigan, playing the whole game in a 1–0 upset win against Manchester City. However, only three days later, Wigan were relegated from the Premier League following a 4–1 defeat against Arsenal. 
He scored his second goal for the club against MK Dons in the FA Cup on 4 January 2014. Espinoza scored his second league goal and provided an assist for teammate Shaun Maloney against Fulham on 1 November 2014 at the DW Stadium in a 3–3 draw.

However, Espinoza's minutes dwindled in the 2014–15 season, and he and Wigan agreed to part ways in December 2014.

Return to Kansas City

Espinoza returned to Sporting Kansas City ahead of the 2015 season. In his second start since returning to Sporting, Espinoza scored an equalizing goal against FC Dallas on 14 March 2015. Espinoza saw his first season back in Kansas City curtailed through injury though the side still won the 2015 Lamar Hunt U.S. Open Cup. Espinoza played a key role as Sporting KC repeated the feat two years later, lifting the 2017 Lamar Hunt U.S. Open Cup by beating the New York Red Bulls 2–1 at Children's Mercy Park. In the 2018 MLS season, Espinoza has set a new career-high with nine assists in a single season, having never produced more than five in the past.

In August 2021, Espinoza took an assistant coaching role with the Sporting KC Academy as part of his B License course in the U.S. Soccer Coaching Education program. Espinoza would serve as an U-13 assistant.

On 13 January 2022, it was announced that SKC had re-signed Espinoza to a one-year contract for the 2022 Major League Soccer season.

International career
Espinoza was called up to the Honduras national football team by Reinaldo Rueda for the UNCAF Nations Cup 2009 held in Honduras for the first time in his career. He made three appearances during the tournament where he wore number 13. He scored his first goal for the national team in a 1–0 win against El Salvador to give Honduras 3rd place in the competition.

Espinoza was called up by Luis Fernando Suárez to represent his country in the 2012 London Olympics; he scored a goal against Brazil in the quarter-final of the tournament, but was sent off in the 90th minute, receiving standing ovation from the Newcastle crowd for his performance.

Espinoza has represented Honduras at the 2010 and 2014 FIFA World Cups.

On 16 August 2019, Espinoza announced his retirement from the Honduras national team.

International goals
Scores and results list Honduras's goal tally first.

Career statistics

Club

International

Personal life
Espinoza became a United States citizen in March 2008.  He is married to Kansas City Current player Lo'eau LaBonta.

Honours
Sporting Kansas City
Lamar Hunt U.S. Open Cup: 2012, 2015, 2017

Wigan Athletic
FA Cup: 2012–13

References

External links

 
 Article about him on El Tiempo
 

1986 births
Living people
People from Puerto Cortés
Honduran emigrants to the United States
Soccer players from Denver
Association football midfielders
Honduran footballers
Honduras international footballers
Olympic footballers of Honduras
Footballers at the 2012 Summer Olympics
2009 UNCAF Nations Cup players
2009 CONCACAF Gold Cup players
2010 FIFA World Cup players
2011 CONCACAF Gold Cup players
2014 FIFA World Cup players
Yavapai Roughriders men's soccer players
Ohio State Buckeyes men's soccer players
Arizona Sahuaros players
Sporting Kansas City players
Wigan Athletic F.C. players
Sporting Kansas City II players
Major League Soccer players
Major League Soccer All-Stars
Premier League players
English Football League players
USL Championship players
Sporting Kansas City draft picks
Honduran expatriate footballers
Expatriate soccer players in the United States
Expatriate footballers in England
Designated Players (MLS)
Honduran expatriate sportspeople in England
FA Cup Final players
Honduran expatriate sportspeople in the United States